The Sony FE 100mm F2.8 STF GM OSS is a premium full-frame smooth trans focus prime lens for the Sony E-mount, announced by Sony in 2017.

The lens is currently Sony's only native lens offering Smooth Trans Focus. This compromise in design results in the lens exhibiting the bokeh of an F2.8 lens, while having the light-gathering capabilities of an F5.6 lens, thus requiring good lighting conditions or flash in order to best use the lens.

Given its unusually high 1:4 (0.25x) image reproduction ratio, the 100mm GM lens can be considered a pseudo-macro lens.

Though designed for Sony's full frame E-mount cameras, the lens can be used on Sony's APS-C E-mount camera bodies, with an equivalent full-frame field-of-view of 150mm.

See also
List of Sony E-mount lenses
Sony STF 135mm f/2.8 STF
Venus Optics Laowa 105mm f/2 STF

References

Camera lenses introduced in 2017
100